Prince Hashim Stadium is a multi-purpose stadium in Ar Ramtha, Jordan. It is currently used mostly for football matches. The stadium holds 5,000 people.

References

External links

Football venues in Jordan
Multi-purpose stadiums in Jordan
Irbid Governorate